James Arthur Mathewson (June 26, 1890 – August 23, 1963) was a Canadian politician.

Born in Montreal, Quebec, Mathewson received a Bachelor of Arts degree in 1912 and a Bachelor of Civil Law degree in 1917 from McGill University. He was called to the Quebec Bar in 1917. He was a captain in the 42nd Battalion Royal Highlanders of Canada during World War I. After the war, he was a lawyer in Montreal. He was created a King's Counsel in 1926.

He was a member of the Montreal City Council for Saint-André from 1926 to 1930. He ran unsuccessfully for mayor in 1930 losing to Camillien Houde. He was the Liberal member of the Legislative Assembly of Quebec for Montréal–Notre-Dame-de-Grâce from 1939 to 1948. He was treasurer of Quebec from 1939 to 1944.

He was awarded an honorary doctorate degree from McGill University in 1943.

References

1890 births
1963 deaths
Canadian military personnel of World War I
Canadian King's Counsel
Lawyers in Quebec
Montreal city councillors
Quebec Liberal Party MNAs
Burials at Mount Royal Cemetery
McGill University Faculty of Law alumni